Rafael Nadal defeated Stanislas Wawrinka in the final, 6–2, 6–4 to win the men's singles tennis title at the 2013 Madrid Open.

Roger Federer was the defending champion, but lost to Kei Nishikori in the third round. This edition of the Madrid Open was the first since 2001 (when the tournament was held in Stuttgart) to not feature either of the top two seeds in the quarterfinals, as world No. 1 Novak Djokovic was defeated in the second round by Grigor Dimitrov.

Seeds
The top eight seeds receive a bye into the second round.

Draw

Finals

Top half

Section 1

Section 2

Bottom half

Section 3

Section 4

Qualifying

Seeds

Qualifiers

Lucky loser
  Marinko Matosevic

Qualifying draw

First qualifier

Second qualifier

Third qualifier

Fourth qualifier

Fifth qualifier

Sixth qualifier

Seventh qualifier

References

External links
 Main Draw
 Qualifying Draw

Men's singles